Later may refer to:

 Future, the time after the present

Television
 Later (talk show), a 1988–2001 American talk show
 Later... with Jools Holland, a British music programme since 1992
 The Life and Times of Eddie Roberts, or L.A.T.E.R., a 1980 American sitcom
 "Later" (BoJack Horseman), an episode

Other uses
 Later (magazine), a 1999–2001 British men's magazine
 Later (novel), a 2021 novel by Stephen King
 "Later" (song), a 2016 song by Example
 Later: My Life at the Edge of the World, a book by Paul Lisicky

See also
 
 L8R (disambiguation)
 Late (disambiguation)
 See You Later (disambiguation)
 Sooner or Later (disambiguation)